Bowling railway station was a railway station located in the village of Bowling, Scotland, on the Lanarkshire and Dunbartonshire Railway.

Bowling station was closed in 1951 before this section of the L&DR was abandoned in 1960 (the parallel GH&DR being retained and electrified as part of the North Clyde electrification scheme). The trackbed through Bowling now forms a footpath and cycleway, part of National Cycle Network Route 7.

Gallery

References

Notes

Sources

External links
 RAILSCOT on the Lanarkshire and Dunbartonshire Railway

Disused railway stations in West Dunbartonshire
Railway stations in Great Britain opened in 1896
Railway stations in Great Britain closed in 1917
Railway stations in Great Britain opened in 1919
Railway stations in Great Britain closed in 1951
Former Caledonian Railway stations